Daniel Lorenzo Campos Reyman (born 17 July 1981) is a Chilean former professional footballer who played as a defender for clubs in Chile, Indonesia and Norway.

Club career
A defender from the Deportes Concepción youth ranks, he won the 2000 national youth championship at under-19 level. With a stint in Universidad de Concepción in 2001, he stayed with Deportes Concepción until 2003, then he moved to Huachipato for the 2003 Torneo Clausura Primera División.

In Chile, he also played for Deportes Puerto Montt, Fernández Vial, Deportes Copiapó and Unión La Calera. 

Abroad, he had a stint with Persmin Minahasa in the Liga Indonesia 2006, coinciding with his compatriot Jorge Toledo and becoming the top goalscorer of the club with 11 goals. In 2011, after a trial with Lota Schwager, he moved to Norway and played for IL Varegg in the 3. Divisjon.

His last club was Fernández Vial in the Chilean Tercera División.

International career
Campos represented Chile at under-20 level in both the 2001 South American Championship and the 2001 FIFA World Youth Championship. In addition, he made appearances in friendly matches, even scoring a goal versus Costa Rica U20.

Controversies
Previous to 2001 FIFA World Youth Championship, Campos and seven other players were arrested in a brothel what must to be closed. The incident was known as "El episodio de las luces rojas" (Chapter of the red lights) due to the excuse employed by Jaime Valdés.

After the tournament, the eight players (Valdés, Millar, Salgado, Pardo, Soto, Droguett, Órdenes and Campos) were suspended for three international matches.

Honours
Deportes Concepción U19
 National Youth Championship: 2000

References

External links
 
 

1981 births
Living people
Sportspeople from Concepción, Chile
Chilean footballers
Chilean expatriate footballers
Chile under-20 international footballers
Deportes Concepción (Chile) footballers
Universidad de Concepción footballers
C.D. Huachipato footballers
Puerto Montt footballers
Persmin Minahasa players
C.D. Arturo Fernández Vial footballers
Deportes Copiapó footballers
Unión La Calera footballers
Primera B de Chile players
Chilean Primera División players
Norwegian Third Division players
Tercera División de Chile players
Chilean expatriate sportspeople in Indonesia
Chilean expatriate sportspeople in Norway
Expatriate footballers in Indonesia
Expatriate footballers in Norway
Association football defenders